Arseni Comas Julià (born 28 June 1961 in Sant Gregori, Girona, Catalonia) is a Spanish retired footballer who played as a defender with a number of different clubs, mostly at the second level of Spanish football. He also represented Spain at youth level, being a member of the Spanish team at the 1979 World Youth Championship.

External links
 
 

1961 births
Living people
People from Gironès
Sportspeople from the Province of Girona
Spanish footballers
Footballers from Catalonia
Association football defenders
Spain youth international footballers
La Liga players
Segunda División players
Segunda División B players
Girona FC players
FC Barcelona Atlètic players
Recreativo de Huelva players
RSD Alcalá players
Granada CF footballers
CD Logroñés footballers
UE Figueres footballers
UE Figueres managers